Mrs Leah Norah Folland JP CBE (1874 – 12 March 1957), was a Welsh educationalist, philanthropist and Liberal Party politician.

Background
Folland was born Leah Norah Thomas (sometimes known as Lilly), at Pontypool, the daughter of Reverend John Thomas, the Baptist minister at Penclawdd. In 1906 she married Henry Folland, a tin plate manufacturer. They had one son, Dudley Croft Folland and one daughter, Patti Eugenie Folland.

Professional career
Folland worked as a teacher at Crwys School at Three Crosses, Swansea and then at Gorseinon School. She was a Justice of the Peace. She was a member of the Council of the University College of Swansea.

Political career
Folland was Liberal candidate for the Gower division at the 1923 General Election. She came second, polling 40.9%. She did not stand for parliament again. In 1939 she was awarded the CBE for political and public services in South Wales.

Electoral record

References

1874 births
1957 deaths
Liberal Party (UK) parliamentary candidates